The first season of The Great Kiwi Bake Off premiered on TVNZ 2 on 16 October 2018 and was hosted by Hayley Sproull and Madeleine Sami with Dean Brettschneider and Sue Fleischl serving as judges. With the exception of the finale, each episode had two bakes out of the typical Signature, Technical and Showstopper format of Bake Off franchises.

The season was won by Annabel Coulter with Stacey Johnsen, Jeff Poole and Hannah Ward finishing as runner-ups.

Bakers
Ages, names, and hometowns stated are at time of filming.

Bakers progress

Colour key:

 Baker was one of the judges' least favourite bakers that week, but was not eliminated.
 Baker was one of the judges' favourite bakers that week, but was not the Star Baker.
 Baker got through to the next round.
 Baker was eliminated.
 Baker was the Star Baker.
 Baker was a runner-up.
 Baker was the season's winner.

Episodes

 Baker eliminated
 Star Baker
 Winner

Episode 1: Cake
For the signature challenge, the bakers had to bake 24 cupcakes with up to two flavors in two hours. For the showstopper challenge, the bakers had to bake the ultimate kid's birthday cake in four hours.

Episode 2: Kiwi Classics
For the technical challenge set by Sue, the bakers had one hour and thirty minutes to bake an upside-down pineapple cake. For the signature challenge, the bakers had to bake 12 identical slices with three components in one hour and thirty minutes.

Episode 3: Dessert
For the technical challenge set by Sue, the bakers had one hour and thirty minutes to bake a raspberry chocolate roulade in the shape of a tree branch. For the signature challenge, the bakers had to bake a pavlova with a layer of curd, an element of whipped cream, and at least three layers in two hours and thirty minutes.

Episode 4: Bread
For the technical challenge set by Dean, the bakers had two hours to bake two four-strand braided challah loaves as well as a homemade lemon surd and butter. For the signature challenge, the bakers had to bake 12 scones, 6 sweet and 6 savoury, in one hour and thirty minutes.

Episode 5: Biscuit
For the technical challenge set by Dean, the bakers had one hour and fifteen minutes to bake 10 Belgian biscuits. For the showstopper challenge, the bakers had to bake and construct a biscuit landmark, with a personal connection to the baker, in three hours and thirty minutes.

Episode 6: Pie and Tart
For the technical challenge set by Dean, the bakers had one hour and thirty minutes to bake a Linzer torte. For the signature challenge, the bakers had to bake a family pie in two hours and thirty minutes.

Episode 7: Free From
For the technical challenge set by Dean, the bakers had two hours to bake an orange & lavender gluten-free cake. For the showstopper challenge, the bakers had to bake a two-tiered gluten-free cheesecake in three hours.

Episode 8: Pastry
For the technical challenge set by Dean, the bakers had two hours to bake 12 retro choux swans. For the signature challenge, the bakers had to bake 12 breakfast pastries, 6 sweet and 6 savoury, in two hours and thirty minutes.

Episode 9: Chocolate (Semi-Final)
For the technical challenge set by Sue, the bakers had one hour and fifteen minutes to bake two chocolate soufflés. For the showstopper challenge, the bakers had three hours to bake a chocolate cake with at least two layers, white, milk and dark chocolate, and tempered chocolate decorations.

Episode 10: Kiwi Picnic (Final)
For the showstopper challenge, the bakers had one hour and thirty minutes to bake 24 identical sausage rolls. For the technical challenge set by Dean, the bakers had two hours and thirty minutes to bake 12 Chelsea buns. For the showstopper challenge, the bakers had to bake an illusion cake, which had to resemble an item taken to a picnic, in five hours.

References

TVNZ original programming
TVNZ 2 original programming
2018 New Zealand television seasons